Black adder may refer to either of two classifications of snake:

 Vipera berus, a viper species found in Europe and Asia
 Eastern hognose snake, a basically non-venomous snake found in the United States

Or the British TV series:
 The Black Adder, first series of the sitcom Blackadder
 "The Black Adder" (pilot episode), the unaired pilot episode of the series

See also
Blackadder (disambiguation)

Animal common name disambiguation pages